Temuan language (Temuan: , , , ,) is a Malayic language (part of the Austronesian language family) spoken by the Temuan people, one of the Orang Asli or indigenous peoples of Peninsular Malaysia which can be found in the states of Selangor, Pahang, Johor, Malacca and Negeri Sembilan. Temuan is a separate language but has a degree of mutual intelligibility with the Malay language. It is written in a Latin alphabet, but no standard orthography has been made.

Examples of Temuan words:

Dialects 
Temuan is divided into two major dialects, namely Belandas and Mantra, which differ mostly in terms of phonology and to some extent vocabulary but are still mutually intelligible.

Comparison between Belandas and Mantra dialects:

Sample of Temuan Belandas dialect –  ('he/she'),  ('only'),  ('we'),  (end of sentence particle).

Sample of Temuan Mantra dialect –  ('he/she'),  ('only'),  ('we'),  (end of sentence particle).

Footnotes

External links
Temuan Web Page Orang Asli Temuan Webpage
 http://projekt.ht.lu.se/rwaai RWAAI (Repository and Workspace for Austroasiatic Intangible Heritage)
 http://hdl.handle.net/10050/00-0000-0000-0003-BE48-2@view Temuan in RWAAI Digital Archive

Agglutinative languages
Languages of Malaysia

Malayic languages